San Daniele Po is a comune  in the Province of Cremona in the Italian region Lombardy, located about  southeast of Milan and about  southeast of Cremona.

San Daniele Po borders the following municipalities: Cella Dati, Motta Baluffi, Pieve d'Olmi, Polesine Zibello, Roccabianca, Sospiro.

References

Cities and towns in Lombardy